Dennis Bryon (born 14 April 1949 in Cardiff, Wales) is a Welsh rock drummer from Cardiff, best known for his work with the Bee Gees from 1974 to 1979. He also worked with Amen Corner and co-produced Robin Gibb's 1983 album, How Old Are You?. Bryon released an autobiography about his years with the Bee Gees on 11 August 2015, called You Should Be Dancing: My Life with the Bee Gees. 
Dennis now tours with 'The Italian Bee Gees' along with fellow former Bee Gees' backing band musician Blue Weaver and former member of The Bee Gees Vince Melouney .

Discography

Bee Gees
Mr. Natural (1974)
Main Course (1975)
Children of the World (1976)
Saturday Night Fever (1977) with various artists
Spirits Having Flown (1979)

References

Welsh drummers
Welsh rock drummers
British male drummers
Living people
Welsh expatriates in the United States
Welsh session musicians
Bee Gees members
1949 births
Musicians from Cardiff